Hulas Motors Pvt. Ltd. is the only commercial vehicle manufacturer in Nepal, manufacturing light commercial vehicles (LCV) as well as Mini Utility Vehicles (MUV). Hulas Motors Pvt. Ltd. was established in 1996 (B. S. 2054). It is a sister concern of Golchha Organization, one of the largest manufacturing companies in Nepal. The designs of Sherpa, Mustang and Mini V are all indigenous to Nepal. The complete R&D is done in house. Hulas Motors has a strategic alliance with its sister concern, Hulas Steel Industries which provides it with engineering and mechanical support. More than 1000 Sherpa and Mustang vehicles are running on roads of Nepal today.

The former Prime Minister of Nepal, Dr. Baburam Bhattarai, used a Hulas Motors-made Mustang as his official vehicle.

In mid-year 2015, the executives of Hulas Motors announced the discontinuation of notable production vehicles, like the Hulas Mustang, and the Hulas Sherpa utility vehicles. The reason behind the discontinuation was that; two years ago, the Nepalese government had ordered the company to upgrade the engines to Euro III standards. The executives say that they could not find a perfect Euro III standard engine, exhibiting high performance in both normal and hilly roads before the deadline expired. They also lobbied for the government to extend the expiry date of the deadline they had to meet.

On July 8, 2016, it was announced that Hulas Motors had begun the production of an all-electric passenger car, and is currently undergoing testing in various areas of Nepal, including Kathmandu city, and other rural and hilly areas. The electric car is said to be priced at NRs 14 to 15 lakh or NRs 1.4 to 1.5 million. The car is said to have various features like power windows, power lock system, power steering system, and an air conditioning system.

Current models include:
Hulas Cargo
Hulas E-Rickshaw
Hulas da vinci

Former models include:
Hulas Mini-ev
Hulas Mini-V
Hulas Mustang
Hulas Sherpa

External links
Official website of the Hulas Motors Pvt. Ltd.

Car manufacturers of Nepal
Vehicle manufacturing companies established in 1996
1996 establishments in Nepal